Micheel Ângelo Quintanilha Pinheiro, simply known as Micheel (born 26 November 1990 in Rio de Janeiro, Brazil)  is a Brazilian footballer, who plays as a midfielder.

Honours

Club
Duque de Caxias
 Copa Rio: 2013

Campinense
 Campeonato Paraibano: 2015

Ergotelis
 Gamma Ethniki: 2017

External links

Soccerpunter.com Profile
Micheel at playmakerstats.com (English version of ogol.com.br)

1990 births
Living people
Brazilian footballers
Associação Atlética Coruripe players
Ergotelis F.C. players
Ethnikos Piraeus F.C. players
Association football midfielders
Footballers from Rio de Janeiro (city)